Veszprém Barabás Kézilabda Club was a women's handball team from Veszprém.

History 

The club was founded under the name Veszprém Vasas in 1966, but went through a name evolution during the years. It has been changed to Bakony Vasas and Bakony Vegyész later, after the nearby mountain Bakony.

The team enjoyed their best spell from the late 60's to the early 80's, having won the championship title once and being runners-up five times. That time the club had players like the World Cup winner Erzsébet Lengyel or Borbála Tóth Harsányi and her sister Katalin Tóth Harsányi, who have won bronze medal on the 1976 Summer Olympics in Montréal. In the late eighties, due to the lack of financials the team slowly decreased, and got relegated to Nemzeti Bajnokság I/B in 1986. Five years later they suffered a further level drop, having won only one game in their second division campaign that season. They played in county level until the club's revival in 2002.

That time Árpád Barabás stood behind the club and granted the financial background. One year later, in 2003, they promoted to NB II and in 2009 they have finally climbed back to the top division.

In the 2011–12 season, after some of the sponsors stepped down, Veszprém faced a financial crisis, following they let their key players to go. For a brief period it was not even sure whether they can maintain their top division membership, despite being mid-table team. Finally in May 2012 the club signed a co-operation agreement with Győri Audi ETO KC for a period of three years, according to which Győr delegate 14 players to Veszprém, all of whom played for the second division winning team of ETO 2 in the previous season. Since the farm teams are not eligible for promotion, this move ensures the continuous development of the Győr youngsters and in the same time Veszprém can further run a top-flight team. The sides also agreed upon that Kálmán Róth, head coach of the Győri Audi ETO 2 and the Hungarian women's junior national team takes the managerial duties. The club also solved the financial problems by acquiring a new main sponsor, Duna Takarék, altering their name to Veszprém Barabás Duna Takarék KC. After two years, ETO moved the club and the NB I starting right to Mosonmagyaróvár. This is when the history of the Mosonmagyaróvár Handball Club began. Veszprém Barabás KC was closed down in 2014.

Kits

Results 
Nemzeti Bajnokság I:
Gold: 1970
Silver: 1969, 1971, 1974, 1975, 1983
Bronze: 1968, 1972, 1976, 1981, 1982, 1984
Magyar Kupa:
Winners: 1973, 1984

Team

Current squad 
Squad for the 2012–13 season

Goalkeepers
 12  Bettina Pásztor
 16  Vivien Víg

Wingers
 4  Boglárka Hosszu
 5  Viktória Kokas
 6  Nadine Schatzl
 9  Orsolya Pelczéder

Line players
 7  Fruzsina Palkó
 31  Bianka Takács

Back players
 2  Eszter Tóth
 8  Ivett Kurucz
 10  Krisztina Bárány
 13  Dóra Horváth
 14  Szimonetta Planéta
 23  Gabriella Tóth

Staff members 
  Chairman: Árpád Barabás
  Head Coach: Kálmán Róth
  Technical Director: János Gyurka
  Goalkeeping Coach: János Szathmári
  Youth Coach: Tibor Horváth
  Physiotherapist: Ferenc Cseh
  Club Doctor: Tibor Sidó, MD
  Club Doctor: László Pintér, MD

See also 
 2011–12 Nemzeti Bajnokság I (women's handball)

References

External links 
 Official website of Veszprém Barabás KC

Hungarian handball clubs
Handball clubs established in 1966
Veszprém